Kuhi Kheyl (also Romanized as Kūhī Kheyl and Kūhīkheyl) is a city and capital of Gil Khuran District, in Juybar County, Mazandaran Province, Iran.  At the 2006 census, its population was 1,939, in 499 families.

References

Populated places in Juybar County

Cities in Mazandaran Province